Donald James Porter (March 24, 1921 – February 17, 2003) was a United States district judge of the United States District Court for the District of South Dakota.

Education and career

Born in Madison, South Dakota, Porter received a Bachelor of Science degree from the University of South Dakota in 1942 and a Bachelor of Laws from the University of South Dakota School of Law in 1943. He was in the United States Army during World War II, from 1943 to 1946. He was staff attorney of the Office of Temporary Controls, in Sioux Falls, South Dakota, in 1946. He was also staff attorney of the Office of Temporary Controls, in Saint Paul, Minnesota, in 1947. He was in private practice, in Chamberlain, South Dakota, from 1947 to 1959. He was the state attorney of Brule County, South Dakota, from 1948 to 1952. He served as a South Dakota state representative, from 1955 to 1957. He was the state attorney of Brule County, from 1957 to 1959. He was in private practice in Pierre, South Dakota, from 1959 to 1977. He was an associate justice of the South Dakota Supreme Court, from 1977 to 1979.

Federal judicial service

Porter was nominated by President Jimmy Carter, on March 15, 1979, to the United States District Court for the District of South Dakota, to a new seat created by 92 Stat. 1629. He was confirmed by the United States Senate, on May 10, 1979, and received his commission on May 11, 1979. He served as Chief Judge from 1985 to 1991. He assumed senior status on March 16, 1992, taking inactive senior status in 1993. While he remained a federal judge, he no longer heard cases or participated in the business of the court. He remained in that status until his death.

Notable law clerk

Among the judicial law clerks that served Porter was Roberto Lange.

Death

Porter died on February 17, 2003, in Pierre of complications of Alzheimer's disease.

References

Sources
 

1921 births
2003 deaths
People from Madison, South Dakota
Members of the South Dakota House of Representatives
Judges of the United States District Court for the District of South Dakota
United States district court judges appointed by Jimmy Carter
20th-century American judges
Justices of the South Dakota Supreme Court
People from Pierre, South Dakota
United States Army personnel of World War II
University of South Dakota School of Law alumni
People from Chamberlain, South Dakota